In taxonomy, the Korarchaeota are a phylum of the Archaea. The name is derived from the Greek noun koros or kore, meaning young man or young woman, and the Greek adjective archaios which means ancient. They are also known as Xenarchaeota.

Taxonomy
Korarchaeota is regarded as a phylum, which itself is part of the archaeal TACK superphylum which encompasses Thaumarchaeota (now Nitrososphaerota), "Aigarchaeota", Crenarchaeota (now Thermoproteota), and "Korarchaeota".

Species
 "Candidatus Korarchaeum cryptofilum" Elkins et al. 2008
 "Candidatus Methanodesulfokores washburnensis" McKay et al. 2019

Phylogeny
Analysis of their 16S rRNA gene sequences suggests that they are a deeply branching lineage that does not belong to the main archaeal groups, Thermoproteota and Euryarchaeota.  Analysis of the genome of one korarchaeote that was enriched from a mixed culture revealed a number of both Crenarchaeota- and Euryarchaeota-like features and supports the hypothesis of a deep-branching ancestry.

Reference species
The strain Korarchaeum cryptofilum was cultivated in an enrichment culture from a hot spring in Yellowstone National Park in USA 2008. The cells are long and needleshaped, which gave the species its name, alluding to its "cryptical filaments".  This organism lacks the genes for purine nucleotide biosynthesis and thus relies on environmental sources to meet its purine requirements.

Ecology
The Korarchaeota have only been found in hydrothermal environments. They appear to have diversified at different phylogenetic levels according to temperature, salinity (freshwater or seawater), and/or geography.  Korarchaeota have been found in nature in only low abundance.

See also
 List of Archaea genera

References

Further reading

Scientific journals

Scientific books

Scientific databases

External links

Archaea phyla